A Certified Respiratory Therapist (CRT), formerly Certified Respiratory Therapy Technician (CRTT), is a therapist who has graduated from a respiratory therapy program at a university or college and has passed a national certification exam. A CRT or RRT is typically expected to adjust, modify or recommend therapeutic techniques within well-defined procedures based on a limited range of patient responses. In the healthcare setting, usually required supervision by a physician experienced in respiratory care.

History
1988 - Certification exam reduced from 200 to 140 questions
1994 - Number of options reduced from 5 to 4 within items on the Certification and Therapist Written Examinations
1999 - CRTT transitioned to CRT, “Therapist” replaced “Technician” in the title
2000 - Computer administrations, results on the day of testing

From the 1980s through the 2000s, 49 states passed legislation relying on results from the certification examination as a central component in the regulation of respiratory therapists.

Changes in education requirements for the CRT vs the RRT have resulted in the CRT level practitioners having the same responsibilities and practice abilities, in most areas of the United States. However, the RRT credential is preferred in the vast majority of healthcare facilities in the United States.  The RRT is considered an advanced respiratory therapist, a CRT an entry level.  It is very difficult and almost unheard of for a Respiratory Care Department manager to achieve management level without being registered. Also, it is very difficult for a CRT to achieve supervisor status without first obtaining RRT status.  Even then, a bachelor's degree is highly preferred.

Examinations
In the United States the examination is one of two levels of the National Board of Respiratory Care-entry level examination, which was the only level of respiratory therapist testing available until the creation of the RRT.  Graduates of accredited associate level college programs or higher (bachelor, masters) are eligible to sit for this examination.
In Latin America the Latin American Board for Professional Certification in Respiratory Therapy awards certification as a Certified Respiratory Therapist.  Eligibility requirements by the Latin American board are on-the-job training with three years of experience or graduation from a respiratory therapy certificate program.

See also
Respiratory therapy
Certified Respiratory Therapist
Certified Pulmonary Function Technician

References

Allied health professions
Respiratory therapy
Respiratory therapist credentials and certifications